Drygas is a Polish surname. Notable people with the surname include:

 Kamil Drygas (born 1991), Polish footballer
 Maciej Drygas (born 1956), Polish film director

See also
 

Polish-language surnames